Bert Joseph James "Poddy" Davie (2 May 1899 – 3 June 1979) was an Australian sportsman who represented Tasmania and Victoria at first-class cricket and played Australian rules football with Geelong in the Victorian Football League (VFL).

Davie was recruited locally to Geelong and played 14 games during the 1917 VFL season, which had been depleted due to the war, and a further 12 games in 1918. He made the seniors just once in 1919 and in what was his last game he kicked the only goal of his career.

An opening batsman, Davie made his first-class debut in the 1921/22 summer, for Tasmania against Victoria at Launceston. He scored 56 in both innings and also claimed the wicket of Clarrie Grimmett. Victoria's wicket-keeper in that match, Jim Atkinson, played in the VFL and had also been Davie's opponent when he made his league debut. Davie played another first-class match a year later and then did not make another appearance until 1927, this time a Sheffield Shield fixture for Victoria. It was his final match and he finished his cricket career with 179 runs at 35.80 and just the one wicket at a total cost of 167 runs.

See also
 List of Victoria first-class cricketers
 List of Tasmanian representative cricketers

References

External links

Cricinfo: Bert Davie

1899 births
1979 deaths
Australian rules footballers from Hobart
Geelong Football Club players
Australian cricketers
Tasmania cricketers
Victoria cricketers
Cricketers from Hobart